Al Saqib Fi al-Manâqib is a book on the miracles of Muhammad, other prophets, and Shiite imams. It has also been called Saqib Al Manaqib. The book was written by Ibn Hamzeh Tousi, also known as Emad al Din Tousi, an Imami jurist in the sixth year of Hijrah.

Content
The book has fifteen chapters. The first focuses on Muhammad's miracles, while following chapters look at Ali, Fatimah, and Hasan Ibn Ali's miracles.

The text focuses only on miracles and wonderworks (Karamat), rather than the figures' biographies. Included miracles include speaking with animals, knowledge to Absent Things, and an instance when Hasan Ibn Ali was able to change the sexuality of a man and a woman.

Sources 
Some sections of the text draw from other books, including:

Bosatan Al Kiram By Muhammad Ibn Ahmad Ibn Shazan Qommi
 Mafakhir Al Riza by Hakem Neishabouri
 Helyat Al Oliyya by Hafiz Abu Naeem Isfahani
 Fazael Al Batoul by abu Mousa
 Siyyar Al Aemmah (destinies of Imams) by Moulini

References

Shia hadith collections
Shia bibliography